Odd Jobs is a 1986 American comedy film directed by Mark Story. It was the last film distributed by TriStar Pictures before HBO dropped out of the TriStar venture and sold half of its shares to Columbia Pictures (later sold to Sony).

Plot
College students Max (Paul Reiser) and Dwight (Robert Townsend) form a moving company to pay for tuition. Along the way they cross the mob who runs a rival moving company.

Cast 
 Paul Reiser as Max
 Robert Townsend as Dwight
 Scott McGinnis as Woody
 Rick Overton as Roy
 Paul Provenza as Byron
 Leo Burmester as Wylie D. Daiken
 Thomas Quinn as Frankie
 Savannah Smith Boucher as Loretta & Lynette
 Richard Dean Anderson as Spud
 Richard Foronjy as Manny
 Ken Olfson as Mayor Brady
 Charlie Dell as Earl
 Starletta DuPois as Dwight's Mother
 Don Imus as Monty Leader
 Wayne Grace as Roy's Father
 Julianne Phillips as Sally
 Leon Askin as Don Carlucci
 Andra Akers as Mrs. Finelli
 Chuck Pfeiffer as The Doris Bodyguard & Dead Meat
 Jill Goodacre as Co-Ed
 Tom Dugan

Critical reception
The movie received generally poor reviews. The Sun-Sentinel called it "insufferable" and full of "stupid sight gags and pointless jokes."

References

External links
 
 

1986 films
1986 comedy films
Films scored by Robert Folk
1986 directorial debut films
American comedy films
TriStar Pictures films
1980s English-language films
1980s American films